The Unforeseen was a Canadian drama television series which aired on CBC Television from 1958 to 1960.

Premise
This anthology series featured stories of suspense or plots with surprise endings. Donald Jack and executive producer Peter Francis were among the few Canadian writers, since producers found it difficult to find domestic talent who could adequately create stories to suit the format.

The Unforeseen was purchased for broadcast in the United Kingdom by Granada Television.

Scheduling
In the first season, The Unforeseen was broadcast in a half-hour timeslot on Thursdays at 8:30 p.m. from 2 October 1958 to 2 April 1959. The following season was broadcast on Wednesdays at 10:00 p.m. from 28 October 1959 to 9 March 1960.

References

External links
 
 

CBC Television original programming
1958 Canadian television series debuts
1960 Canadian television series endings
1950s Canadian drama television series
1960s Canadian drama television series
Black-and-white Canadian television shows